Deborah Ann Dingell (November 23, 1953) is an American politician and member of the Democratic Party who has been the U.S. representative for Michigan's 6th congressional district since 2015  (known as the 12th congressional district until 2023). She is the widow of John Dingell, her predecessor in the seat, who holds the record as the longest-serving member of Congress in U.S. history. She worked as a consultant to the American Automobile Policy Council. She was a superdelegate for the 2012 Democratic National Convention in Charlotte, North Carolina.

Dingell is active in several Michigan and Washington, D.C., charities and serves on a number of charitable boards. She is a founder and past chair of the National Women's Health Resource Center and the Children's Inn at the National Institutes of Health (NIH). She is also a member of the board of directors for Vital Voices Global Partnership. She is a 1975 graduate of the Edmund A. Walsh School of Foreign Service at Georgetown University.

Life and career

Descended from one of the Fisher brothers, owners of Fisher Body, from 1919 a part of General Motors, she has served as president of the General Motors Foundation and as executive director of Global Community Relations and Government Relations at GM.

She married Representative John Dingell, 27 years her senior, in 1981; she was his second wife. She had grown up as a Republican, but became a Democrat soon after marrying Dingell. Their marriage lasted 38 years until her husband's death on February 7, 2019, at the age of 92.

She is a member of the Democratic National Committee from Michigan and chaired Vice President Al Gore's campaign in Michigan in 2000. In 2004, she also helped secure the Michigan Democratic primary and general election vote for John Kerry in Michigan.

In November 2006, Dingell was elected to Wayne State University's board of governors.

Dingell and Senator Carl Levin were proponents of moving up Michigan's presidential primary before February 5 in an attempt to garner greater political influence for Michigan during the 2008 Democratic primaries. This resulted in Michigan almost losing its delegates' votes in the Democratic National Convention.

When Carl Levin announced his retirement from the U.S. Senate at the end of his term in 2015, Dingell indicated that she was interested in running for his seat. When former Michigan Governor Jennifer Granholm declined to run for the seat, a Politico writer declared Dingell to be one of the front-runners for the Democratic nomination, alongside Representative Gary Peters. She chose not to run, and Peters won the seat.

U.S. House of Representatives

Elections

2014
Dingell indicated that she planned to run for her husband's congressional seat after he announced his retirement. On August 5, she won the Democratic primary. On November 4, she won the general election, defeating Republican Terry Bowman.  When Dingell was sworn in, she became the first U.S. non-widowed woman in Congress to succeed her husband. His father, John Dingell Sr., held Michigan's 12th district for 22 years before his son won it. Altogether, the Dingells have represented this district and its predecessors for 89 consecutive years as of 2021. The district was numbered as the 15th from 1933 to 1965, the 16th from 1965 to 2003, the 15th again from 2003 to 2013, and has been the 12th since 2013.

Tenure
In 2018, Dingell introduced a law that would give the Consumer Product Safety Commission the authority to recall defective firearms. John Dingell was a key lawmaker who initially granted the firearms industry this exemption from the 1972 Consumer Product Safety Act that created the Consumer Product Safety Commission.

In July 2019, Dingell voted against a House resolution introduced by Representative Brad Schneider opposing efforts to boycott the State of Israel and the Global Boycott, Divestment, and Sanctions Movement. The resolution passed 398–17.

In April 2021, Dingell introduced the Recovering America's Wildlife Act of 2021, a bill that would provide funding for conserving and protecting endangered and threatened species, strategies to do so, and wildlife-related recreational activities. The bill passed the House by 230–190 on June 14, 2022.

In 2023, Dingell was among 56 Democrats to vote in favor of H.Con.Res. 21 which directed President Joe Biden to remove U.S. troops from Syria within 180 days.

Trump impeachment
After Dingell voted to impeach President Donald Trump, Trump attacked Dingell during a campaign rally in Battle Creek, musing that her late husband, might be in hell, saying of him, "Maybe he's looking up, I don't know, I don't know, maybe, maybe. But let's assume he's looking down." She was attending a bipartisan Problem Solvers Caucus gathering when she was told of Trump's remarks. Numerous members of both parties came to Dingell's defense. In her response to the incident, Dingell called for a return to civility, saying, "some things should be off limits." In her 2022 book Confidence Man, New York Times reporter Maggie Haberman wrote that Dingell received a call from a man claiming to be a reporter who asked whether she was "looking for an apology from Trump". According to Haberman, "Dingell couldn't shake the idea that his voice sounded like that of the forty-fifth president."

Committee assignments
 Committee on Energy and Commerce
Subcommittee on Health
 Subcommittee on Communications & Technology
 Subcommittee on Consumer Protection & Commerce
Subcommittee on the Environment & Climate Change
 Committee on Natural Resources
Subcommittee on National Parks, Forests, and Public lands
Subcommittee on Oversight & Investigations

Caucus memberships
Congressional Progressive Caucus 
Congressional Arts Caucus 
Congressional Caucus on Macedonia and Macedonian-Americans
Medicare for All Caucus
Blue Collar Caucus
Problem Solvers Caucus

See also
 Women in the United States House of Representatives

References

External links

 Debbie Dingell official U.S. House website
 Debbie Dingell for Congress
 

 

|-

|-

1953 births
21st-century American politicians
21st-century American women politicians
Democratic Party members of the United States House of Representatives from Michigan
Debbie
Walsh School of Foreign Service alumni
Female members of the United States House of Representatives
Living people
Michigan Republicans
Politicians from Detroit
Women in Michigan politics